The Goyt Way is a  walking route from Etherow Country Park, Greater Manchester, to Whaley Bridge, Derbyshire, following the valley of the River Goyt. It is part of the longer Midshires Way, which in turn is part of the E2 European long-distance path. The path is waymarked, and intersects with the Cheshire Ring Canal Walk and the Peak District Boundary Walk. It passes through the following settlements: Compstall, Marple, Strines, Brookbottom, Hague Bar, New Mills and Furness Vale. In its latter stages, it follows the towpath of the Peak Forest Canal to its terminus at Whaley Bridge.

See also
Recreational walks in Cheshire
Recreational walks in Derbyshire

References

Footpaths in Derbyshire
Footpaths in Greater Manchester
Long-distance footpaths in England
New Mills
Marple, Greater Manchester